Sagitta is a genus of Chaetognatha, a phylum commonly known as arrowworms or arrow worms. Phylum Chaetognatha comprises small marine worms.

This genus is characterized in part by the distribution of the cilia on the body, the thick rays in the fins, and hooks which are not serrated.

As of 2007 there are 15 species. More have since been described.

Species include: 
Sagitta abyssicola
Sagitta bedoti
Sagitta bipunctata – Commons
Sagitta bruuni
Sagitta euneritica
Sagitta euxina
Sagitta glacialis
S. g. baltica
S. g. glacialis
Sagitta izuensis
Sagitta kussakini
Sagitta modesta
Sagitta nagae
Sagitta nutana
Sagitta pulchra
Sagitta sceptrum
Sagitta setosa
Sagitta sublica

References

External links

Chaetognatha